Succinyl-CoA ligase [GDP-forming] subunit alpha, mitochondrial is an enzyme that in humans is encoded by the SUCLG1 gene.

Structure 
The enzyme encoded by SUCLG1 can exist in either a phosphorylated form or a dephosphorylated form. In the dephosphorylated structure, a phosphate ion works in coordination with a histidine residue in the active site and the two alpha helices, one contributed by each subunit of the alphabeta-dimer to stabilize the structure. One of the alpha helices contains amino acids, the modification of which result in conformational changes that accommodate either the bound phosphoryl group or the free phosphate ion.

Function 
This gene encodes the alpha subunit of the heterodimeric enzyme succinate coenzyme A ligase. This enzyme is targeted to the mitochondria and catalyzes the conversion of succinyl CoA and ADP or GDP to succinate and ATP or GTP. Mutations in this gene are the cause of the metabolic disorder fatal infantile lactic acidosis and mitochondrial DNA depletion.

Clinical significance 
Succinate-CoA ligase deficiency is responsible for encephalomyopathy  with mitochondrial DNA depletion and mild methylmalonic aciduria. Mutations in SUCLG1 lead to complete absence of SUCLG1 protein and are responsible for a very severe disorder with antenatal manifestations. Furthermore, it is shown that in the absence of SUCLG1 protein, no SUCLA2 protein is found in fibroblasts by western blot analysis. This result is consistent with a degradation of SUCLA2 when its heterodimer partner, SUCLG1, is absent. As mitochondrial DNA depletion in muscle is not a constant finding in SUCLG1 patients, diagnosis should not be based on it; additionally, it may be that alternative physiopathological mechanisms may be considered to explain the combined respiratory chain deficiency observed in these patients.

Interactive pathway map

References

Further reading

External links